Abu Hardub is a Syrian town located in Mayadin District, Deir ez-Zor.  According to the Syria Central Bureau of Statistics (CBS), Abu Hardub had a population of 8,657 in the 2004 census.

Pro-Kurdish and pro-coalition sources reported on 2 January 2018 that SDF had captured towns of Abu Hardub.

References 

Populated places in Deir ez-Zor Governorate
Populated places on the Euphrates River